Hank Kazmierski is a retired American soccer forward who played professionally in the North American Soccer League and American Soccer League.

Kazmierski graduated from Mount Saint Joseph High School in Baltimore, Maryland.  He attended the University of Baltimore, playing on the men's soccer team from 1968 to 1971.  He graduated in 1972 and is a member of the UB Athletic Hall of Fame.  In May 1973, Kazmierski signed with the Baltimore Bays of the American Soccer League.  In 1974, he moved to the Baltimore Comets of the North American Soccer League, playing with them through the 1975 season.

In 1994, he was inducted into the Maryland Soccer Association Hall of Fame.

References

External links
 NASL stats

1949 births
Living people
Soccer players from Baltimore
American soccer players
American Soccer League (1933–1983) players
Baltimore Bays (1972–73) players
Baltimore Comets players
North American Soccer League (1968–1984) indoor players
North American Soccer League (1968–1984) players
Association football forwards